Chris Townsend may refer to:

 Chris Townsend (writer) (born 1949), hillwalker and author
 Chris Townsend (commercial director), commercial director at the London 2012 Organising Committee
 Chris Townsend (footballer) (born 1966), Welsh former footballer
 Chris Townsend (cricketer) (born 1972), English educator and former cricketer

See also
 Christopher Townsend, visual effects supervisor